Szczecińsko–Polickie Przedsiębiorstwo Komunikacyjne (SPPK) is a bus transport company in Szczecin and gmina Police, Poland. The headquarters is located in Police, at 21 Fabryczna Street.

It has been operating as a separate company since 1 February 1997, when the company was separated from MZK Szczecin. Initially, shares in the company were divided in half between city Szczecin and gmina Police. Nowadays, 66% of shares are owned by city Police.

The company, on behalf of the Zarząd Dróg i Transportu Miejskiego, currently operates following bus lines: 63 (together with SPAK), 101, 102, 103, 106, 107, 109, 110, 111, fast line F and night lines 524 and 526. Moreover, the company deals with serving a bus line (regardless of the ZDiTM) between Police and Trzebież (Linia Samorządowa) and a bus line for allotments' owners (Linia Działkowa). There is also a bus line aimed at workers of the Police chemical plant.

The current chairman is Kazimierz Trzciński.

Vehicles

External links 
 Official website of the company
 Public transport Szczecin

Sources
 Official website of the company

Transport in Szczecin